Kate Lucy Ward (1833-1915) was a British composer, teacher, and vocalist. She was born in Wiltshire and studied at the Royal Academy of Music in London. Felix Mendelssohn praised her compositions during one of his visits to England.

Ward's music was published by A. Hammond & Co. Her compositions include:

Theatre
music for small stage productions
The Tempest (text by James T. Fields)

Vocal
"Ah, My Heart is Weary" 
"At the Gate" 
"Bell of the Wreck"
"Do Not Look at Life's Long Sorrow" (text by Adelaide A. Procter)
"Lock of Brown Hair" 
"Love is Timid" (text by Daniel Weir)
"Mother, the Winds are at Play"
"O Loving Eyes" (text by Florence Percy) 
"Poppies Pale on Thy Pillow Weep" (text by Florence Percy) 
"Silver Moth"
"True Hearts"
"True Song" (text by Florence Percy)
"Warrior's Grave"
"Watching"

References 

British women composers
1833 births
1915 deaths
Musicians from Wiltshire
19th-century British composers
Alumni of the Royal Academy of Music
Date of birth missing
Date of death missing
Place of death missing